Itatiba is a municipality in the state of São Paulo in Brazil, approximately 80 km from the State Capital. It is part of the Metropolitan Region of Campinas. The population is 122,581 (2020 est.) in an area of 322.28 km². The average elevation is 750 m. The place's name comes from the Tupi Guarani language, and means "Many Rocks". The city is known as the "Princess of the Hill" due to its rugged terrain. According to the Federation of Industries of the State of Rio de Janeiro, Itatiba is the third city with the highest quality of life in Brazil, presenting a FIRJAN Municipal Development Index of 0.9276. It is considered to be the town with the 3rd highest levels of oxygen in the air in the whole world. It used to be the furniture capital of Brazil.
Itatiba also has the biggest thematic zoo in Latin America, the "Zooparque".

The city is also base of the famous country club and golf course Quinta da Baroneza.

Sister cities

  Tosa, Kōchi, Japan
Since August 5, 1989

  Toro, Molise, Italy
Since September 4, 2009

  Oratino, Molise, Italy
Since April 6, 2018

Government
Mayor: Thomás Antonio Capeletto de Oliveira (2021/2024)
Deputy Mayor: Mauro Delforno (2021/2024)

Transportation
Near cities: Campinas, Valinhos, Vinhedo, Louveira, Jundiaí, Jarinú, Bragança Paulista, Morungaba and Atibaia.

Near Airports
International Airport of Viracopos - Campinas, 50 km;
Internacional Airport of Congonhas - São Paulo, 84 km;
Internacional Airport of São Paulo-Guarulhos (Cumbica), 100 km;
Airport of Bragança Paulista, 35 km;
Airport of Jundiaí, 24 km;.

Public Transit Service
The company that provides bus transportation in Itatiba is Transporte Coletivo de Itatiba (TCI).

Buses between cities
Rápido Fênix Viação - Campinas through Valinhos (EMTU), Campinas through Louveira, Jundiaí, Morungaba, Amparo, Atibaia, Bragança Paulista. Campinas through Rodovia Dom Pedro I (EMTU), Bragança Paulista, Jundiaí, Morungaba, Amparo, Serra Negra, Lindóia, Águas de Lindóia, São Paulo through Rodovia dos Bandeirantes, São Paulo through Rodovia Anhanguera, Santos, São Vicente, Praia Grande, Mongaguá.

Distances
80 km from São Paulo (city)
34 km from Campinas
18 km from Jundiaí
30 km from Jarinu
35 km from Atibaia 
35 km from Bragança Paulista
100 km from Jacareí
14 km from Vinhedo
10 km from Valinhos
18 km from Louveira
15 km from Morungaba

References

External links
Municipality of Itatiba